Recently, because of the economic recession that had been affecting Argentina since 2018 and which intensified from 2020, some Argentines are moving to Brazil in search of better opportunities.

The runaway inflation rate, tax increases, the strict control of capital, the increase in Argentine company bankruptcies and the constant loss of value of the Argentine Peso, represent some of the factors that lead to increase in the Argentine immigration process to Brazil and other countries.

A growing Argentine migratory movement exists of young people and families to neighboring countries such as Brazil and Uruguay, as well as to other continents. The majority of the Argentine population is financially dependent on the state. And the main reason to leave is to escape Argentine hyperinflation.

However, following the recent Brazilian economic recession and the COVID-19 pandemic in Brazil, many Argentinians left Brazil and returned to their homeland, heavily decreasing the immigration.

Argentine people in the world
Most Argentines outside Argentina are people who have migrated from the middle and upper middle classes. According to official estimates there are 600,000 worldwide Argentine, according to estimates by the International Organization for Migration are about 806,369 since 2001. It is estimated that their descendants would be around 1,900,000. The first wave of emigration occurred during the military dictatorship between 1976 and 1983, with principally to Spain, United States, Mexico and Venezuela. During the 1990s, due to the abolition of visas between Argentina and the United States, thousands of Argentines emigrated to the North American country. The last major wave of emigration occurred during the 2001 crisis, mainly to Europe, especially Spain, although there was also an increase in emigration to neighboring countries, particularly Brazil, Chile and Paraguay.

Main Argentine communities in Brazil 

 São Paulo
 Rio de Janeiro
 Florianópolis
 Armação de Búzios
 Curitiba
 Porto Alegre
 Balneário Camboriú
 Belo Horizonte
 Campinas
 Foz do Iguaçu

Notable Argentine Brazilians

Adriana Prieto
Amaury Pasos
Antônio Salvador Sucar
Carolina Ardohain
Claudio Slon
Fernando Meligeni
Héctor Babenco
João Paulo Cuenca
Juan Darthés
Luis Favre
Miguel Rolando Covian
Paola Carosella
Patricia Maldonado
Pit Passarell
Renata Fronzi
Sebastián Cuattrin
Dany Roland

See also
 Argentina–Brazil relations
 Immigration to Brazil
 Argentines
 White Brazilian
 Argentine people

References

 
Ethnic groups in Brazil
Brazilians